RoadKillOvercoat is a studio album by American rapper Busdriver. It was released on Epitaph Records in 2007.

Critical reception

At Metacritic, which assigns a weighted average score out of 100 to reviews from mainstream critics, the album received an average score of 68, based on 13 reviews, indicating "generally favorable reviews".

Jason Crock of Pitchfork gave the album a 6.9 out of 10, saying, "Nobody and Boom Bip provide beats that draw from a wider range of styles and flirt with an alien, psychedelic edge, giving Busdriver enough room to be as weird as he wants to be."

Jeff Shaw of City Pages placed it at number 10 on the "Top 10 Albums of 2007" list.

Track listing

Personnel
Credits adapted from liner notes.

 Busdriver – vocals, production (4, 7)
 Nobody – production (1, 2, 4, 5, 8, 9, 11)
 Boom Bip – production (3, 6, 10, 12), vocals (12)
 Bianca Casady – vocals (7), production (7)
 Isaiah Ikey Owens – synthesizer (11)
 Yadira Brown – vocals (12)
 Seripop – design

References

Further reading

External links
 

2007 albums
Busdriver albums
Epitaph Records albums